The 1942 NCAA Cross Country Championships were the fifth annual cross country meet to determine the team and individual national champions of men's collegiate cross country running in the United States.

Since the current multi-division format for NCAA championship did not begin until 1973, all NCAA members were eligible. In total, 16 teams and 63 individual runners contested this championship.

The meet was hosted by Michigan State College at the Forest Akers East Golf Course in East Lansing, Michigan for the fifth consecutive time. Additionally, the distance for the race was 4 miles (6.4 kilometers). This was the first championship since 1942 after the 1943 race was cancelled due to World War II.

The team national championship was won by both Indiana and Penn State (the third for the Hoosiers and the first for the Nittany Lions) in a tie. The individual championship was won by Oliver Hunter, from Notre Dame, with a time of 20:18.0.

Men's title
Distance: 4 miles

Team Result

References
 

NCAA Cross Country Championships
NCAA Men's Cross Country Championships
Sports competitions in East Lansing, Michigan
NCAA Cross Country
November 1942 sports events
Michigan State University
Track and field in Michigan